Price's Bush Tramway was a  bush tramway built around 1903 near Akatarawa in the Tararua Range of New Zealand's North Island. It was built with a raised Fell third rail for braking the loaded trucks, as used by the Rimutaka Incline.

History
Price's Bush was an area owned and milled by Thomas Price (1838–1906), who owned milling operations in Lower Hutt and Petone. It lay in the upper reaches of the Hutt Valley to Waikanae on the Kapiti Coast in a rugged hill country.

The tramway had wooden rails with a track gauge of  equal to that of the main line or Wellington tram respectively. Between the two rails, on which the wheels ran, there was a raised wooden rail. This was used for braking the loaden trucks downhill, as known from the Fell mountain railway system on the Rimutaka Incline.

Additional literature 
 Tony Walzl: Akatarawa and Pakuratahi Forests History.

References 

 

4 ft gauge railways in New Zealand
3 ft 6 in gauge railways in New Zealand
Logging railways in New Zealand
Tararua Range